Timothy P. Green (born June 29, 1963) is a Democratic politician from Missouri. He was born in St. Louis, Missouri.

He received a Bachelor of Science degree in business administration from University of Missouri-St. Louis. He has had two children, Patrick Timothy and Megan, with his wife, Lisa Ann.

He was first elected to public office in 1988, when he won election to the Missouri House of Representatives. He was reelected in 1990, 1992, 1994, 1996, 1998, and 2000. He served as the powerful chairman of the Budget Committee from 2000 to 2002. In 2004, he was elected to the Missouri State Senate. He is a member of the following committees:
Appropriations
Commerce, Consumer Protection, Energy and the Environment
Rules, Joint Rules, Resolutions and Ethics
Small Business, Insurance and Industry
Joint Committee on Capital Improvements and Leases Oversight
Joint Committee on Gaming and Wagering
Joint Committee on Legislative Research
Joint Committee on Public Employee Retirement
Joint Committee on Government Accountability
Missouri State Employees' Retirement System Board

References
Official Manual, State of Missouri, 2005-2006.  Jefferson City, MO:Secretary of State.

External links
Missouri Senate - Timothy P. Green official government website
 
Follow the Money - Timothy P. Green
2008 2006 2004 Missouri Senate campaign contributions
2000 1998 1996 Missouri House campaign contributions

1963 births
Politicians from St. Louis
University of Missouri–St. Louis alumni
Democratic Party members of the Missouri House of Representatives
Living people
Democratic Party Missouri state senators